João Sabino de Matos Neto (born ) is a Brazilian futsal player who plays as a goalkeeper for Jaraguá and the Brazilian national futsal team.

References

External links
Liga Nacional de Futsal profile
The Final Ball profile

1991 births
Living people
Futsal goalkeepers
Brazilian men's futsal players